Turks in Montenegro, also known as Turkish Montenegrins and Montenegrin Turks, are ethnic Turks who form an ethnic minority in Montenegro.

History 

In 1496 the Ottoman Empire conquered Montenegro which bequeathed a significant Turkish community due to the Ottoman colonisation process. However, in the early 20th century, after the Ottomans were defeated in the Balkan Wars, the majority of Turks along with other Muslims living in the region left their homes and migrated to Turkey as muhacirs ("refugees").

Demographics 

According to the 2011 census, there were 104 Turks living in the country, forming a minority of some 0.02% of the total population. However, the former vice president of the Parliament of Montenegro, Suljo Mustafić, has stated that whilst there are only 50 families which still speak the Turkish language, the population of Montenegrins of Turkish origin is significantly higher.

Age-sex structure 
The average age of the Turkish minority is slightly higher than 40 years old. The population is overwhelmingly male (>65%), as there are only 36 females (<35%).

Religion
 Islam is the predominant faith among Turks in Montenegro: 101 out of 104 ethnic Turks belong to this religion (this is over 97% in percentage terms). There is one Turkish atheist living in Montenegro and two other Turks did not state their religion.

Diaspora
Many Montenegrin Turks have emigrated to Turkey and live predominantly in Istanbul and Izmir.

Notable people
, politician
Şakir Bayhan, forest engineer and lexicographer
, soldier, politician and businessman
Suljo Mustafić, former Vice President of the Parliament of Montenegro
, bureaucrat and politician

See also  
Montenegro–Turkey relations
Turkish minorities in the former Ottoman Empire
Turks in the Balkans
Islam in Montenegro
Montenegrin–Ottoman War (1876–1878)
The Mountain Wreath

References

Montenegro
Montenegro
Ethnic groups in Montenegro
Muslim communities in Europe